Weston Longville is a civil parish in the English county of Norfolk, approximately  north-west of Norwich.  Its name is derived from the Manor of Longaville in Normandy, France, which owned the local land in the 12th century.
For the purposes of local government, it falls within the district of Broadland.

History
The villages name means 'West farm/settlement'. 'Longville' after Longueville-sur-Scie, Normandy.

The Domesday book recorded that this manor was under the ownership of the Bishop of Bayeux.

The village was home to the 18th-century clergyman and diarists, James Woodforde and his niece Anna Maria Woodforde. The village pub is named for James. He has a reputation as a man with a fondness for food which comes from the much edited published versions of his diaries; the originals provide a rich and unique insight into 18th-century rural English life. A complete and unabridged edition of his diary has been published in 17 volumes.

A World War II airfield located in the parish is now a turkey farm. Weston Hall and Park, also in the parish, have a golf course and a tourist attraction, the Dinosaur Adventure Park.

Notes

External links
Broadland District Council tourism - page concerning Weston Longville.

Villages in Norfolk
Broadland
Civil parishes in Norfolk